Jürg Wenger (born 1969) is a Swiss skeleton racer who competed from 1991 to 2003. He won a gold medal in the men's skeleton event at the 1995 FIBT World Championships in Lillehammer.

References
Men's skeleton world championship medalists since 1989
Skeletonsport.com profile

1969 births
Living people
Swiss male skeleton racers